Theodore Judson Jemison (August 1, 1918 – November 15, 2013), better known as T. J. Jemison, was the president of the National Baptist Convention, USA, Inc. from 1982 to 1994. It is the largest African-American religious organization. He oversaw the construction of the Baptist World Center in Nashville, Tennessee, the headquarters of his convention.

In 1953, while minister of a large church in Baton Rouge, Louisiana, Jemison helped lead the first civil rights boycott of segregated seating in public bus service. The organization of free rides, coordinated by churches, was a model used later in 1955–1956 by the Montgomery bus boycott in Alabama. Jemison was one of the founders of the Southern Christian Leadership Conference in 1957.

In 2003, the 50th anniversary of the Baton Rouge bus boycott was honored with three days of events in the city. These were organized by a young resident born two decades after the action.

Background
T. J. Jemison was born in 1918 in Selma, Alabama where his father, the Reverend David V. Jemison, was the pastor of the Tabernacle Baptist Church. He came from a family of prominent ministers and strong churchgoing women. He attended local segregated public schools.

Jemison earned a bachelor's degree from Alabama State University, a historically black college in the state capital of Montgomery, where he joined Alpha Phi Alpha fraternity. He earned a divinity degree at Virginia Union University in the capital city of Richmond, Virginia, to prepare for the ministry. He later did graduate study at New York University in New York City.

Career
In 1949, Jemison was first called as a minister by Mt. Zion First Baptist Church in Baton Rouge. There he worked chiefly on internal church matters, overseeing construction and continued fundraising of a new church building. At the time, his father was serving as President of the National Baptist Convention, the association of African-American Baptist churches established in 1895.

Within a few years, Jemison became involved in an early civil rights action. In 1950, the city had ended black-owned buses, requiring all residents to use its monopoly system, which enforced segregated seating. It was racially segregated by law; in practice, black citizens had to sit at the back half of the bus or stand, even if seats in the front "white" section were empty. Jemison said later he was struck by "watching buses pass by his church and seeing black people standing in the aisles, not allowed by law to sit down in seats reserved for whites. 'I thought that was just out of order, that was just cruel'."

Making up 80 percent of the passengers on the system, African Americans were fed up with standing on buses while "white" seats remained empty, particularly after the company had raised fares from ten to fifteen cents in January 1953. Rev. Jemison took up the issue with the Baton Rouge City Council; he testified on February 11, 1953, against the fare increase and asked for an end of the practice of reserving so many seats for whites. The city council met that demand, without abolishing segregation per se. They passed Ordinance 222, which established a first come-first served system: it allowed black passengers to board the bus from the back and take any empty seats available, while white passengers boarded from the front. In actuality though, the white drivers largely ignored the ordinance and continued to pressure blacks to sit in the rear of the buses.

When bus drivers harassed those black passengers who sought to sit in empty seats reserved for whites, Jemison tested the law on June 13, 1953, when he sat in a front seat of a bus. The next day the bus company suspended two bus drivers for not complying with the city ordinance. The drivers' union responded by striking for four days. That strike ended on June 18, 1953, when state Attorney General Fred S. LeBlanc declared the city ordinance unconstitutional on the grounds that it violated the state's compulsory segregation laws.

Reverend Jemison set up a free-ride network, coordinated by the churches, to compensate for the lack of public transit. This was its signature action for the boycott, which was also adopted for later use. "While the Baton Rouge boycott lasted only two weeks, it set protest standards, and is growing in recognition as a precedent-setting event in the history of the modern American civil rights movement."

With most of the black bus riders refusing to ride, by the third day the buses were almost entirely empty. The boycott lasted eight days, as Reverend Jemison called it off after successful negotiations between black leaders and the city council. The following day, the city council passed an ordinance under which the first-come, first-served, seating system of back-to-front and front-to-back was reinstated. In addition, they set aside the first two seats on any bus for white passengers and the back bench for black passengers, while allowing anyone to sit on any of the rows in the middle. To comply with state segregation laws, blacks and whites were prohibited from sitting next to each other within this arrangement. Jemision's model of boycotting in Baton Rouge was adopted in 1955 by organizers of the year-long Montgomery bus boycott. Martin Luther King Jr. wrote, Jemison's "painstaking description of the Baton Rouge experience proved invaluable."

While a number of boycotters wanted to continue the action to attack segregation directly, the majority approved the compromise.

Presidency of the National Baptist Convention
Jemison was elected as president of the National Baptist Convention, USA, Inc., the largest black religious organization, in 1982 and served until 1994. His best-known achievement of his tenure as president of the National Baptist Convention was the construction of the Baptist World Center in Nashville, Tennessee. It is a headquarters for the convention. He publicly opposed the nomination of Clarence Thomas, a conservative African American as an associate justice of the United States Supreme Court. He also objected to American intervention in the Gulf War.

Toward the end of his term as convention president, Jemison faced criticism because of his support for the boxer Mike Tyson, who was convicted in a rape case against a black woman. He was strongly criticized both by church members and observers.

Controversy regarding 1994 transition of NBC leadership
Approaching the end of his tenure (a result of term limits), Jemison selected W. Franklyn Richardson as his successor, but Richardson was defeated by Henry Lyons at the 1994 convention.

Jemison filed a lawsuit in attempt to overrun the result. Eventually, through the appeals process, the election of Lyons was upheld. Jemison individually, as well as a co-plaintiff and their counsel, was ordered to pay $150,000 in punitive damages. By a later court order, Jemison and his co-plaintiff were required to pay the other side's attorney fees. The court found that Jemison had concocted evidence to justify the suit.

Legacy and honors
 Jun 19–21, 2003, the 50th anniversary of the bus boycott and its participants were honored with a community forum and three days of events; organizers were Marc Sternberg, a 30-year-old resident, Southern University, Louisiana State University, and major organizations. Sternberg said, "Before Dr. King had a dream, before Rosa kept her seat, and before Montgomery took a stand, Baton Rouge played its part."
 2007, Mt. Zion First Baptist Church established the annual T. J. Jemison Race Relations Award in his honor. It was first awarded that year to Jesse Bankston, a long-term Democratic politician in Baton Rouge.

Death
Jemison died in Baton Rouge at the age of ninety-five.

On March 11, 2017, Jemison was among five persons inducted into the Louisiana Political Museum and Hall of Fame in Winnfield. He was cited posthumously for his pioneering work in the Southern Christian Leadership Conference and his pastorate of the Mount Zion First Baptist Church of Baton Rouge.

References

External links
 
 Commemorative history of the Baton Rouge bus boycott, Louisiana State University
 Jemison in front of Mt. Zion Baptist Church, Baton Rouge, Louisiana
 Image of Theodore J. Jemison speaking before the National Baptist Convention in Los Angeles, California, 1983. Los Angeles Times Photographic Archive (Collection 1429). UCLA Library Special Collections, Charles E. Young Research Library, University of California, Los Angeles.

1918 births
2013 deaths
Activists for African-American civil rights
African-American Baptist ministers
Alabama State University alumni
Virginia Union University alumni
New York University alumni
Clergy of historically African-American Christian denominations
National Baptist Convention, USA ministers
African-American activists
Activists from Selma, Alabama
People from Baton Rouge, Louisiana
Louisiana Democrats
Baptists from Louisiana
Baptists from Alabama
21st-century African-American people